Joyland may stand for:

Places
 Joyland (Beijing), a software company in Beijing
 Joyland Beach, Ontario, a small community in Ramara Township, Ontario
 Joyland (Lahore), a theme park in Lahore, Punjab
 Joyland (Great Yarmouth), children's amusement park in Great Yarmouth

United States
 Joyland Amusement Park, a theme park in Lubbock, Texas
 Joyland Amusement Park (Wichita, Kansas), a former amusement park in Wichita, Kansas
 Joyland, Arkansas, a small town in Arkansas
 Joyland (Atlanta), a neighborhood of southeast Atlanta, Georgia
 Joyland Park, Arkansas, a small community in Arkansas
 Joyland, Lexington, a neighborhood in Lexington, Kentucky
 Joyland, North Carolina, a community annexed by the city of Durham, North Carolina

Art, entertainment and music
 "Joyland", a song on the 2003 album Get What You Need by The Undertones
 Joyland (Andy McKee album), 2010
 Joyland (Trust album), 2014
 Joyland (2022 film), a Pakistani film

Literature
 Joyland (Schultz novel), a 2005 novel by Emily Schultz
 Joyland: A hub for short fiction, established 2008, an international literary magazine
 Joyland (King novel), a 2013 novel by Stephen King